University Preparatory Secondary School (UPSS) is a private secondary school in Benin City, Edo State, Nigeria. It was established in 1987 by Professor Andrew Urevbu. It has received numerous academic, social, and sports awards.

References 

Education in Benin City
Secondary schools in Edo State
Educational institutions established in 1987
1987 establishments in Nigeria

The school is a great place of learning, university preparatory secondary school is one of the best school in Benin city and should be interviewed by wiki to get correct information. The school is how every over 30years of academic success. UPSS is based on visual learning and physical learning which most school in Benin hardly do.